Walter Haverhals (30 April 1948 – 14 November 2018) was a sailor from Belgium. Haverhals represented his country at the 1972 Summer Olympics in Kiel. Haverhaels took 18th place in the Soling with Dirk de Bock as helmsman and Charles de Bondsridder as fellow crew member.

References

1948 births
2018 deaths
People from Wilrijk
Belgian male sailors (sport)
Sailors at the 1972 Summer Olympics – Soling
Olympic sailors of Belgium